Jeanetta Calhoun Mish (born 1961) is an American poet and served as Oklahoma's twenty-first poet laureate.

Biography
Born in Hobart, Oklahoma in 1961, Mish was educated at the University of Houston, the University of Texas of the Permian Basin, and the University of Oklahoma, where she earned her doctorate in 2009. She is a faculty member in the Red Earth MFA in creative writing at Oklahoma City University, which she also serves as program director. Mish is the founder and editor of Mongrel Empire Press, based in Norman, Oklahoma.

Works 
 Tongue-Tied Woman (Soulspeak, 2001)
 Work is Love Mad Visible (West End Press, 2009)
 Ain't Nobody that can Sing like Me: New Oklahoma Writing, ed. (Mongrel Empire Press, 2010)
 Oklahomeland: Essays (Lamar University Press, 2015)
 What I Learned at the War (West End Press, 2016)

See also 

 Poets Laureate of Oklahoma

References 

1961 births
Living people
Poets Laureate of Oklahoma
People from Hobart, Oklahoma
University of Houston alumni
University of Texas Permian Basin alumni
University of Oklahoma alumni
Oklahoma City University faculty
American women poets
21st-century American poets
American women academics
21st-century American women writers